Wetherby is a civil parish in the metropolitan borough of the City of Leeds, West Yorkshire, England.  The parish contains 33 listed buildings that are recorded in the National Heritage List for England.  All the listed buildings are designated at Grade II, the lowest of the three grades, which is applied to "buildings of national importance and special interest".  The parish contains the town of Wetherby and the surrounding area.  The listed buildings include houses and associated structures, road and railway bridges, churches, public houses, a bath house, former farm buildings, a town hall, a former railway engine shed, and two mileposts.


Buildings

References

Citations

Sources

Lists of listed buildings in West Yorkshire